Song of Songs is the second album led by trumpeter Woody Shaw which was recorded in 1972 and released on the Contemporary label.

Reception

Scott Yanow of Allmusic stated, "The music falls between hard bop, modal musings and the avant-garde. Although possessing a tone similar to Freddie Hubbard's, Woody Shaw was a more advanced player and his solos throughout the date are both original and consistently exciting".

Track listing 
All compositions by Woody Shaw
 "Song of Songs" - 11:37   
 "The Goat and the Archer" - 7:33   
 "Love: For the One You Can't Have" - 10:03   
 "The Awakening" - 8:44

Personnel 
Woody Shaw - trumpet
Bennie Maupin (track 2), Ramon Morris (tracks 1 & 3) - tenor saxophone
Emanuel Boyd - flute, tenor saxophone
George Cables - piano, electric piano
Henry Franklin - bass
Woody Theus - drums

References 

Woody Shaw albums
1973 albums
Contemporary Records albums